Tembi Golgir Rural District is a rural district (dehestan) in Golgir District, Masjed Soleyman County, Khuzestan Province, Iran. At the 2006 census, its population was 4,619, in 966 families.  The rural district has 52 villages.

References 

Rural Districts of Khuzestan Province
Masjed Soleyman County